Theodor Ludwig Lau (Königsberg, East Prussia, 15 June 1670-Altona, February 1740) was a German lawyer known for his radical writings. He adopted a materialistic-and pantheistic interpretation of Spinoza's Ethics shared by Friedrich Wilhelm Stosch.

Works
 Meditationes philosophicae de Deo, Mundo, et Homine (1717)
 Meditationes, Theses, Dubia philosophico-theologica (1719).
 Entwurf einer wohleingerichteten Polizey (Frankfurt-Main 1717)

References

1670 births
1740 deaths
18th-century philosophers
German ethicists
German philosophers
18th-century German writers
18th-century German lawyers
18th-century German male writers